Juan José Sagarduy (14 June 1941 – 4 October 2010) was a Spanish professional cyclist. His last victory as a professional was the Subida a La Reineta in 1967, after physical problems shortened his career. He was forced to retire early in 1969, after being unable to finish his final race at the Vuelta a Levante.

Biography
Sagarduy was born in Zaratamo on 14 June 1941 and died in Galdakao at the age of 69. A great climber of the sixties, his best season was in 1963, when he won the Subida a Arrate ahead of Federico Bahamontes and Jacques Anquetil, the Bicicleta Eibarresa and the GP Pascuas in Pamplona among other races. At the 1964 Tour del Porvenir, he won two stages and the mountains classification.

He died on 4 October 2010. His funeral was held on Wednesday October 6 at the church of San Pedro de Basauri at half past six in the afternoon.

Career
His most notable result was his victory in the 1963 Euskal Bizikleta, where he also won the mountains classification and the 5th stage. In 1965 he was selected to ride in the Tour de France. He finished in 46th place. Within the national tests he took the podium in the third stage of the Vuelta a Mallorca and on the Ascent to La Reineta. He then signed for Karpy and retired from cycling in March 1969, after eight years as a professional.

Major results

1961
 1st G. P. Ayuntamiento de Bilbao
1963
 1st  Overall Euskal Bizikleta
1st Stage 5
 1st GP Pascuas
 1st 
 1st Stage 8 Vuelta a Andalucía
 1st Stage 1 Circuito Montañés
1964
 1st Gran Premio de Llodio
 2nd Subida a Urkiola
 8th Overall Vuelta a Andalucía
 9th Overall Tour de l'Avenir
1st Stages 6 & 7
1st  Mountains classification
1st  Points classification
1965
 1st Stage 3a Vuelta a Mallorca
 4th Overall Euskal Bizikleta
1966
 1st GP Pascuas
 1st Stage 1 Euskal Bizikleta
 1st Stage 7 Volta a la Comunitat Valenciana
 3rd Subida a Arrate

Grand Tour results

Tour de France
 1965: 46

Vuelta a España
 1968: 41

References

External links
 

1941 births
2010 deaths
Spanish male cyclists
People from Greater Bilbao
Sportspeople from Biscay
Cyclists from the Basque Country (autonomous community)

Subida a Arrate